The 1917–18 Northern Rugby Football Union season was the third  season of Rugby league's Wartime Emergency League football. Each club played a differing number of fixtures, depending upon the closeness of neighbours, ease of travel etc., with Rochdale Hornets playing (and losing) only 7 games and St. Helens 18 while Wigan played 35 and several other clubs 31.

Season summary
The war was starting its fourth year and the Rugby League again continued with the Wartime Emergency League set up. This arrangement, as in other sports, meant that the sport could continue, which in turn would boost the public’s moral. The fixtures were usually quite local, thus cutting down on travelling time and costs, whilst not wasting precious war resources.

Several clubs did not participate during this season :-

Huddersfield
Oldham
Wakefield Trinity withdrew again
York withdrew
Keighley again did not take part and in fact did not re-enter the league until the first peacetime League in 1919-20.

No clubs  re-joined the League and no new clubs joined the league for this season.

Barrow (90.91%) finished the regular season top of the league (40 points) although only playing 22 games, with Dewsbury (87.10%) this time in second place (with 54 points from 31 games)..

Barrow took the title for the first time in their history.

There were no other trophies to play for during this season.

Championship

Challenge Cup

The Challenge Cup Competition was suspended for the duration of the war.
The majority of the trophies, such as the County Leagues and County Cups were also suspended for the duration of the First World War.

See also 
British rugby league system
1915–16 Northern Rugby Football Union Wartime Emergency League season
1916–17 Northern Rugby Football Union Wartime Emergency League season
1918–1919 (January) Northern Rugby Football Union Wartime Emergency League season
1919 (Feb-May) Northern Rugby Football Union Victory season
The Great Schism – Rugby League View
The Great Schism – Rugby Union View
List of defunct rugby league clubs

References

External links
1896–97 Northern Rugby Football Union season at wigan.rlfans.com
Hull&Proud Fixtures & Results 1896/1897
 Widnes Vikings - One team, one passion Season In Review - 1896-97 
Saints Heritage Society
Warrington History
Wigan Archives - Cherry and white

1917 in English rugby league
1918 in English rugby league
Northern Rugby Football Union seasons